Cédric Vallet (born 22 September 1971) is a French cross-country skier. He competed at the 1992 Winter Olympics and the 1994 Winter Olympics.

References

1971 births
Living people
French male cross-country skiers
Olympic cross-country skiers of France
Cross-country skiers at the 1992 Winter Olympics
Cross-country skiers at the 1994 Winter Olympics
Sportspeople from Haute-Savoie
20th-century French people